Amanda Jeannette Detmer (born 1971/1972) is an American actress. She made her big screen debut playing Miss Minneapolis in 1999 comedy film Drop Dead Gorgeous, and later had a supporting role in Final Destination. 

In the early 2000s, Detmer had starring roles in comedy films, including Boys and Girls (2000), Saving Silverman (2001), The Majestic (2001), and Kiss the Bride (2002). She has had starring roles in short-lived television series, such as A.U.S.A. (2003) and What About Brian (2006–07).

Early life
Detmer and her family moved to Chico, California when she was in primary school. Her mother, Susan (née Thurmon), is a teacher, and her father, Melvin Lester Detmer, is a singing cowboy. She attended California State University, Chico for her undergraduate education and completed her Master of Fine Arts from New York University's Tisch School of the Arts before embarking on a career in show business.

Career
Detmer made her onscreen debut in 1995 with the television movie Stolen Innocence, and her big-screen debut playing Miss Minneapolis in the beauty pageant-set comedy Drop Dead Gorgeous (1999). In 2000, she appeared as Terry Chaney in the supernatural horror film Final Destination and in the romantic comedy Boys and Girls alongside Freddie Prinze Jr., Jason Biggs and Claire Forlani. The following year, Detmer had major roles in comedy film Saving Silverman with Jason Biggs and romantic comedy-drama The Majestic, directed and produced by Frank Darabont, starring opposite Jim Carrey. She appeared in the cover of Stuff the same year. 

In 2002, she had her first star-billed role in the Metro-Goldwyn-Mayer romantic comedy Kiss the Bride. She also had supporting roles in Big Fat Liar (2002) and You, Me and Dupree (2006).

On television, Detmer was regular cast member on the two short-lived NBC sitcoms, M.Y.O.B. (2000) starring Lauren Graham, and A.U.S.A. (2003) opposite Scott Foley. From 2006 to 2007, she starred in the ABC comedy-drama What About Brian alongside Barry Watson, Sarah Lancaster and Rosanna Arquette. In 2009, she had a recurring role in the ABC medical drama Private Practice. From 2011 to 2012, she co-starred in the another ABC series, short-lived sitcom Man Up!. From 2011 to 2013, Detmer also had a recurring role in USA Network drama series Necessary Roughness. She also guest-starred on Law & Order: Criminal Intent, The Vampire Diaries, The Mentalist and Two and a Half Men. In 2017, Detmer was cast in the unaired television pilot for Red Blooded, for a series meant to star Reba McEntire, which American Broadcasting Company passed on.

Personal life 
Detmer was arrested for a DUI in Chico, California, in December 2019.

Filmography

Film

Television

References

External links

20th-century American actresses
21st-century American actresses
American film actresses
American television actresses
California State University, Chico alumni
Living people
People from Chico, California
Actresses from California
Tisch School of the Arts alumni
Year of birth missing (living people)